Surdila-Greci is a commune located in Brăila County, Muntenia, Romania. It is composed of four villages: Brateșu Vechi, Făurei-Sat, Horia and Surdila-Greci.

The commune is located in the western part of the county, on the border with Buzău County, just west of Făurei. It is crossed by the national road DN2B, which connects the county seat, Brăila, with Buzău.

References

Communes in Brăila County
Localities in Muntenia